Pirsonia is a non photosynthetic genus of heterokonts. It comprises the entirety of the family Pirsoniaceae, order Pirsoniida and class Pirsonea in the subphylum Bigyromonada, phylum Gyrista.

Taxonomy

 Class Pirsonea Cavalier-Smith 2017 [Pirsoniomycetes]
 Order Pirsoniales Cavalier-Smith 1998 [Pirsoniida Cavalier-Smith & Chao 2006]
 Family Pirsoniaceae Cavalier-Smith 1998
 Pirsonia Schnepf, Debres & Elbrachter 1990
 P. diadema Kühn 1996
 P. eucampiae Kühn 1996
 P. formosa Kühn 1996
 P. guinardie Schnepf, Debres & Elbrachter 1990
 P. mucosa Kühn 1996
 P. punctigerae 
 P. verrucosa Kühn 1996

References

External links

Heterokont genera
Heterokonts